Blocked Signals is a 1948 German thriller film directed by Johannes Meyer and starring Heidi Kürschner, Heinz Engelmann, and Wolfgang Lukschy.

Plot 
The story takes place in the port of Hamburg in 1947. The manager of a transport company is found dead, he has been murdered. The police investigation revealed that sinister business was being transacted through the company: Drugs and medicines in particular were trafficked or smuggled. The traffickers prove to be tough as nails in carrying out their unlawful activities. The young helmsman Klaus Kröger also feels this when he gets involved in the affair. But who is behind these machinations, who is the head of the gang? Bruno Kalpak and the forwarder Löllgen come under suspicion. Finally, the late returnee Kröger becomes active on his own initiative and helps the investigating police inspector Ostendorff to dig out the entire gang when the latter is about to rob an entire freight train on the banks of the Elbe. The murderer also falls into the clutches of the police.

Background 
Blocked Signals was created in the film studios of Hamburg-Volksdorf and Hamburg-Ohlstedt as well as in the port of Hamburg (outdoor shots). The film passed the Allied film censors in December 1948 and premiered on December 17, 1948 in Göttingen. The Berlin premiere took place on September 16, 1949 in the west of the city.

Friedrich Kurth took over the production management. Peter Röhrig designed the film structures.

Cast

References

Bibliography

External links 
 

1948 films
1940s thriller films
German thriller films
West German films
1940s German-language films
Films directed by Johannes Meyer
Films set in Hamburg
German black-and-white films
1940s German films